Reşid Pasha, Reşit Pasha, Reshid Pasha or Rashid Pasha may refer to:

People
 Reşid Mehmed Pasha (1780–1839), Ottoman general and Grand Vizier
 Mustafa Reşid Pasha (1800–1858), Ottoman statesman and architect of the Tanzimat reforms
 Mehmed Rashid Pasha (ca. 1825–1871), reformist Ottoman governor of Syria Vilayet
 Reşid Akif Pasha (1863–1920), Ottoman statesman and governor
 Ahmet Reşit Rey (1870–1956), Ottoman statesman and Turkish member of parliament
 Reshid Pasha, Ottoman governor of the Basra Vilayet administrative district

Other uses
 Reşid Pasha Palace, now housing the Baltalimanı Osteopathic Hospital, in Baltalimanı, Istanbul, Turkey